Christine Anne Grimes (born 25 December 1950) is an international lawn and indoor bowler representing Jersey.

Bowls career
Christine was part of the fours team with Suzie Dingle, Gean O'Neil and Karina Bisson that won the silver medal at the 2004 World Outdoor Bowls Championship in Leamington Spa.

Grimes has represented Jersey at four Commonwealth Games; in the triples at the 2006 Commonwealth Games, the pairs at the 2010 Commonwealth Games, the fours at the 2014 Commonwealth Games and in the pairs & fours at the 2018 Commonwealth Games.

In 2005 she won the triples bronze medal at the Atlantic Bowls Championships and two years later she won the triples gold medal at the  2009 Atlantic Bowls Championships. In 2011 she won the singles bronze medal at the Atlantic Bowls Championships.

Grimes is a two times British champion after winning the fours titles in 2009 and 2013 at the British Isles Bowls Championships.

References

External links
 
 
 
 
 

1950 births
Living people
Jersey female bowls players
Bowls players at the 2006 Commonwealth Games
Bowls players at the 2010 Commonwealth Games
Bowls players at the 2014 Commonwealth Games
Bowls players at the 2018 Commonwealth Games